The 1963 North Texas State Eagles football team was an American football team that represented North Texas State University (now known as the University of North Texas) during the 1963 NCAA University Division football season as a member of the Missouri Valley Conference. In their 18th year under head coach Odus Mitchell, the team compiled a 3–6 record. The Eagles game against Southern Illinois scheduled for November 23 at Fouts Field was canceled in deference to the assassination of John F. Kennedy which occurred the previous day at Dallas.

Schedule

References

North Texas State
North Texas Mean Green football seasons
North Texas State Mean Green football